Glitrehøgda  is a mountain in Lunner municipality, Viken county, in southern Norway. It has a height of 308m above sea level.

References 

Mountains of Viken